Tollington Ward is one of sixteen electoral divisions of the London Borough of Islington and is one of the eight that make up the Islington North constituency. The population of this ward at the 2011 Census was 13,211.

It is the only other place in the historic parish of Islington mentioned in the Domesday Book (in the old form Tolentone) as a separate manor.  The manor house was located beside present day Hornsey Road (known as Tollington Lane as late as 1740) and was purchased in 1271 by the priory of St John at Clerkenwell after which the manor's name fell into disuse.

The ward is represented in the Borough's council by three councillors, whose elections are held every four years. The ward is a very safe Labour seat, and stayed Labour even during the years when Islington Council was won by the Liberal Democrats. As of January 2022, the councillors are Milk Gilgunn, Anjna Khurana and Flora Williamson.

References

External links
 Mick Gilgunn
 Anjna Khurana
 Flora Williamson
 Tollington Ward page, Islington Council
 Islington Labour Party
 Islington Liberal Democrats
 Islington Green Party
 Islington Conservative Association
 History of Tollington

Wards of the London Borough of Islington